Katarmal is a remote village located in Kumaon Division, in Almora District, Uttarakhand, India.

Location
Katarmal is located at a distance of 1.5 km from Kosi village and 12 km from the district centre, Almora and 70 km from Nainital. Located at a height of 2116 meters above sea level, it is well connected by road, 30 km away from Khairna, Garampani (Nainital, Haldwani, Coordinates: 29°29'39"N   79°28'46"E) & 33 km from Ranikhet and Kausani the nearest connecting point being near Kosi village. The G.B. Pant Institute of Himalayan Environment and Development, established in 1988 serves as a nodal agency for research and development and was established here by Government of India.

Surya temple
Katarmal is known for a relatively rare Surya temple, constructed by the Katyuri Kings in the 9th century CE and bears witness to the architecture of the day. Masons of the time used a mixture of lime and lentil paste to make the adhesive agent. Katarmalla, a Katyuri king constructed this temple, which has 44 smaller temples around the main deity of Surya, which called as Burhadita or Vraddhaditya. Other deities like Shiva-Parvathi and Lakshmi-Narayana. are also established in this temple complex. The carved wooden doors and panels were transported to the National Museum, Delhi, after an idol from the 10th century was stolen. The temple, which holds other carvings on walls and panels, was declared a monument of national importance under the Ancient Monuments and Archaeological Sites and Remains Act of 1958.

References

Villages in Almora district
Surya temples